Ixia is a genus of cormous plants native to South Africa from the family Iridaceae. Some of them are known as the corn lily. Some distinctive traits include sword-like leaves and long wiry stems with star-shaped flowers. It usually prefers well-drained soil. The popular corn lily has specific, not very intense fragrance. It is often visited by many insects such as bees. The Ixia are also used sometimes as ornamental plants.

The genus name is derived from the Ancient Greek ἰξία (ixia) ( = χαμαιλέων λευκός, (chamaeleon leukos)), the pine thistle, Carlina gummifera, an unrelated plant in the daisy family, Asteraceae.

Species
The genus Ixia includes the following species:

Ixia abbreviata Houtt.
Ixia acaulis Goldblatt & J.C. Manning
Ixia alata Goldblatt & J.C.Manning
Ixia alticola Goldblatt & J.C.Manning
Ixia altissima Goldblatt & J.C.Manning
Ixia angelae Goldblatt & J.C.Manning
Ixia atrandra Goldblatt & J.C.Manning
Ixia aurea J.C. Manning & Goldblatt
Ixia bellendenii R.C.Foster
Ixia bifolia J.C. Manning & Goldblatt
Ixia brevituba G.J. Lewis
Ixia brunneobractea G.J. Lewis
Ixia campanulata Houtt.
Ixia capillaris L. f.
Ixia cochlearis G.J. Lewis
Ixia collina Goldbl. & Snijman
Ixia curta Andr
Ixia curvata G.J. Lewis
Ixia dubia Vent.
Ixia erubescens Goldbl.
Ixia esterhuyseniae M.P.de Vos
Ixia flexuosa L.
Ixia frederickii M.P.de Vos
Ixia fucata
Ixia fucata Ker-Gawl, var. filifolia G.J. Lewis
Ixia fucata Ker-Gawl. var. fucata
Ixia gloriosa G.J Lewis
Ixia latifolia
Ixia latifolia Delaroche var. angustifolia G.J. Lewis
Ixia latifolia Delaroche var. curviramosa G.J. Lewis
Ixia latifolia Delaroche var. latifolia
Ixia latifolia Delaroche var. parviflora G.J. Lewis
Ixia latifolia Delaroche var. ramulosa G.J. Lewis
Ixia leipoldtii G.J. Lewis
Ixia leucantha Jacq.
Ixia longituba N.E.Br.
Ixia longituba N. E. Br. var. bellendenii R.C. Foster
Ixia longituba N. E. Br. var. longituba
Ixia lutea Eckl. var. lutea
Ixia lutea Eckl. var. ovata (Andr.) B. Nord
Ixia maculata
Ixia maculata L. var. fusco-citrina (Desf.ex DC) G.J. Lewis
Ixia maculata L. var. intermedia G.J. Lewis
Ixia maculata L. var. maculata
Ixia marginifolia (Salisb) G.J Lewis
Ixia metelerkampiae L. Bol.
Ixia micranda
Ixia micranda Bak. var. confusa G.J Lewis
Ixia micranda Bak. var. micranda
Ixia micranda Bak. var. minor G.J Lewis
Ixia monadelpha Delaroche
Ixia mostertii M.P.de Vos
Ixia odorata Ker-Gawl var. hesperanthoides G.J Lewis
Ixia odorata Ker-Gawl var. odorata
Ixia orientalis L.Bol.
Ixia paniculata Delaroche
Ixia patens
Ixia patens Ait. var. linearifolia G.J Lewis
Ixia patens Ait var. patens
Ixia pauciflora G.J Lewis
Ixia polystachya
Ixia polystachya L. var. crassifolia G.J Lewis
Ixia polystachya L. var. lutea (Ker-Gawl) G.J Lewis
Ixia polystachya M.P.de Vos var. longistylus var. nova
Ixia polystachya L. var. polystachya
Ixia pumilio Goldbl. & Snijman
Ixia purpureorosea G.J Lewis
Ixia rapunculoides
Ixia rapunculoides Del. var. flaccida G.J Lewis
Ixia rapuncuolides Del. var. namaquana (L.Bol.) G.J Lewis
Ixia rapunculoides Del. var. rapunculoides
Ixia rapunculoides Del. var. rigida G.J Lewis
Ixia rapunculoides Del. var. robusta G.J Lewis
Ixia rapunculoides Del. var subpendula G.J. Lewis
Ixia rouxii G.J Lewis
Ixia scillaris L. var. scillaris
Ixia scillaris L. var. subundulata G.J Lewis
Ixia splendida G.J. Lewis
Ixia stohriae L. Bol.
Ixia stolonifera G.J Lewis
Ixia stricta (Eckl. ex Klatt) G.J Lewis
Ixia tenuifolia Vahl.
Ixia thomasiae Goldblo.
Ixia trifolia G.J Lewis FP
Ixia trinervata (Bak.) G.J Lewis
Ixia vanzijliae L. Bol.
Ixia versicolor G.J Lewis
Ixia vinacea G.J Lewis
Ixia viridiflora Lam.
Ixia viridiflora Lam. var minor M.P.de Vos
Ixia viridiflora Lam. var viridflora Thunb.

See also

 List of plants known as lily

References

Bibliography 

 
 
 
 

 
Iridaceae genera